Mert Han Kurt (born 25 October 2002) is a Belgian footballer who plays as a forward for Turkish club Giresunspor.

Professional career

Early years
Born in Ghent, Belgium, Kurt started his career in the youth academy of Cercle Brugge.

Giresunspor
On 29 June 2022, he transferred to the Turkish Süper Lig club Giresunspor as a professional football player.   He made his professional debut with a 3–2 league loss to Adana Demirspor on 7 August, coming in as a substitute in the 86th minute. He assisted the second goal in the 90+1 minute.

Personal life
Kurt was born and raised in Ghent, Belgium. He has Turkish descent.

Career statistics

References

External links
 
 
 Footballdatabase Profile
 

2002 births
Living people
People from Emirdağ
Belgian footballers
Turkish footballers
Belgian people of Turkish descent
Giresunspor footballers
Süper Lig players
Association football forwards
Expatriate footballers in Turkey